Kanakaraj Sekar is an Indian bioinformatician and a professor at the Department of Computational and Data Sciences of the Indian Institute of Science (IISc). Known for his studies in the field of bioinformatics, Sekar heads the Laboratory for Structural Biology and Bio-computing at IISc. The Department of Biotechnology of the Government of India awarded him the National Bioscience Award for Career Development, one of the highest Indian science awards, for his contributions to biosciences in 2004.

Biography 

Born in the south Indian state of Tamil Nadu, Sekar did his master's degree at the University of Madras and after earning an MSc in biophysics and crystallography in 1982, he continued at the university for his doctoral studies to secure a PhD in biophysics in 1984. His post-doctoral work was on protein crystallography at two institutions, the first at the Indian Institute of Science until 1992 and later, at the Ohio State University from 1995. Returning to India in 1998, he joined the Indian Institute of Science as a senior scientific officer of structural biology and bio-computing at its Bioinformatics Centre and has been serving the institute since then. During this period, he has held various positions including those of a principal research scientist (2004–10) and an associate professor of Computational and Data Sciences (CDS) department. He holds the position of a professor of CDS department since 2016 and heads the Laboratory for Structural Biology and Bio-computing.

Sekar's research in bioinformatics covered the fields of protein crystallography, crystallographic and internet computing as well as the development of value added knowledge bases and algorithms. His studies have been documented by way of a number of articles and Google Scholar, an online repository of scientific articles has listed 211 of them. He has delivered keynote or plenary speeches at international seminars and conferences and has mentored many doctoral and post-doctoral scholars. He is also a member of the International Union of Crystallography (IUCr).

Sekar has held the junior research fellowships of the Council of Scientific and Industrial Research (1984–88) as well as the University Grants Commission of India (1988–89) and the senior research fellowship of the CSIR (1989–92). The Department of Biotechnology of the Government of India awarded him the National Bioscience Award for Career Development, one of the highest Indian science awards in 2004.

Selected bibliography

See also 

 X-ray crystallography
 Crystallographic database

Notes

References

Further reading

External links 
 

N-BIOS Prize recipients
Indian scientific authors
Living people
Year of birth missing (living people)
Scientists from Tamil Nadu
Indian Institute of Science alumni
Academic staff of the Indian Institute of Science
University of Madras alumni
Ohio State University alumni
Indian computer scientists
Indian bioinformaticians